Neophytobius is a genus of minute seed weevils in the beetle family Curculionidae. There are at least two described species in Neophytobius.

Species
These two species belong to the genus Neophytobius:
 Neophytobius cavifrons (LeConte, 1876) i c b
 Neophytobius muricatus (Brisout de Barneville, 1862) g
Data sources: i = ITIS, c = Catalogue of Life, g = GBIF, b = Bugguide.net

References

Further reading

 
 
 

Curculionidae
Articles created by Qbugbot